Ali Riza (Ali Riza Dede or Ali Riza of Elbasan) (1882–1944) was the 2nd Dedebaba (or Kryegjysh) of the Bektashi Order.

Biography
Ali Riza was born in Krujë, Albania; hence, he is sometimes also known as Ali Riza of Kruja. His date of birth is uncertain, and could be either 1876 or 1882.

For 10 years, Ali Riza served at the tekke in Fushë Krujë, after which he served as a dervish in Martanesh. Baba Ahmet Turani then appointed him as the baba of Baba Hamit Tekke in Elbasan. He was the baba of the tekke from November 1921 to December 1941.

After the death of Salih Nijazi Dedebaba, Ali Riza succeeded him as Dedebaba. Although initially reluctant to serve as Dedebaba because he felt that he did not have enough knowledge, he continued to serve in that role until his death on 22 February 1944.

References

1876 births
1944 deaths
Bektashi dedebabas
Albanian Sufis
Albanian religious leaders
People from Krujë